John Stamstad is a member of the Mountain Bike Hall of Fame.  He was famous for his domination of long-distance mountain bike races.  He entered his first long-distance road bike race in 1985.  The  non-stop race was across Missouri from St. Louis to Kansas City and back. In 1991 he switched from road events to ultra-marathon mountain bike events when he entered the Montezuma's Revenge, a 24-hour race in Colorado.

Stamstad has moved on to distance running in recent years, serving as a sponsored "ambassador" for Patagonia, the outdoor clothing and equipment manufacturer. He has spent his time running self-supported across some of the world's most desolate terrain. He ran the  John Muir Trail in 2005, unsupported. On a  desert run, on the White Rim Road in Canyonlands National Park, Stamstad ran with a modified baby jogger full of water .

Major results and records
 Iditasport Race (170 mile) - Alaska -1993, 1994, 1995, 1996
 Iditasport Race (350 mile) - Alaska - 1997, 1998, 1999, 2000
 Ultra-Marathon Cycling Association 24 Hour Off-Road World Record - 
 1996 First solo entry and first solo finish of the 24 Hours of Canaan (He entered as a team using four variations of his name) and bested more than half of the teams. He also remained undefeated in the solo class at 24 Hours of Canaan (and then Snowshoe) until his retirement in 2001.
His individual time trial of 18 days and 5 hours stood for 5 years until it was eclipsed in the inaugural Great Divide Race.

See also
 Wilderness 101
 Marathon Mountain Bike Races

External links
 Bio on the Mountain Bike Hall of Fame 
 Sept 1996 Interview in Outside Magazine - dead link, Oct 2016
 November 1999 Interview in Outside Magazine - dead link, Oct 2016
 August 1999 Interview
 December 2005 Audio Interview (mp3)
 John Stamstad bio on Patagonia.com - dead link, Oct 2016

Marathon mountain bikers
American male cyclists
Living people
Place of birth missing (living people)
American mountain bikers
Year of birth missing (living people)